Nhâm Mạnh Dũng (born 12 April 2000) is a Vietnamese professional footballer who plays for V.League 1 club Viettel and the Vietnam national team.  A versatile player, he can be deployed as a striker or a centre-back.

International goals

Vietnam U19

Vietnam U23

Honours
Viettel
V.League 1: 2020 
Vietnam U23
Southeast Asian Games: 2021
Vietnam
VFF Cup: 2022

References

External links
 

2000 births
Living people
Vietnamese footballers
Viettel FC players
V.League 1 players
People from Thái Bình province
Vietnam international footballers
Association football central defenders
Competitors at the 2021 Southeast Asian Games
Southeast Asian Games competitors for Vietnam